The 1926–27 Sheffield Shield season was the 31st season of the Sheffield Shield, the domestic first-class cricket competition of Australia. South Australia won the championship for the first time since the 1912–13 season. Queensland joined the Championship for the first time, and the method of deciding the title winners was based on average instead of points.

Table

Statistics

Most Runs
Bill Ponsford 1091

Most Wickets
Don Blackie 33

Notable events
Victoria recorded the highest innings total in first-class cricket history, when scoring 1,107 against New South Wales at Melbourne in December 1926. Incredibly, in the return match against New South Wales at Sydney in January 1927 they were dismissed for an innings total of just 35.

References

Sheffield Shield
Sheffield Shield
Sheffield Shield seasons